Romantic fantasy is a subgenre of fantasy fiction, describing a fantasy story using many of the elements and conventions of the chivalric romance genre.

One of the key features of romantic fantasy involves the focus on relationships, social, political, and romantic. Romantic fantasy has been published by both fantasy lines and romance lines.

Some publishers distinguish between "romantic fantasy" where the fantasy elements is most important and "fantasy romance" where the romance are most important. Others say that "the borderline between fantasy romance and romantic fantasy has essentially ceased to exist, or if it's still there, it's moving back and forth constantly".

Common plot archetypes 

 A teenager, typically either from an overly strict or abusive family (or alternately from a family or a village that has been slain by bandits or monsters) runs away and discovers that they possess either magical or psychic powers and a glorious destiny. This destiny often involves saving a city, kingdom, or other large group from harm by a powerful villain or a dangerous monster.

 A somewhat older person, often a minor noble or someone who has recently lost a loved one and has left their previous home in search of a new life (this character is also frequently a magician or psychic), either overthrows an usurper or saves their kingdom from outside invasion. Such characters are rarely warriors, and normally uncover the plot through a combination of intrigue, luck, and use of their powers. In the course of this adventure, the character typically falls in love and, by the end of the novel or at least by the end of the series, their lover becomes their life-partner. The complexities of this romance form a significant focus in these novels.

 In a time of troubles, a group of adolescents or adults are drawn together through circumstance and destiny to form a group or organization that is larger than the sum of its parts. Generally, these young people are outcasts, orphans, or people on the fringes of society. Most or all of these people also possess some form of special powers. The groups' special powers sometimes form a complementary set, such as a group comprising four people each of whom has the ability to command one of the four classical elements. These characters eventually find friendship, community, and sometimes love with the others in their newly formed group. This group frequently ends up either overthrowing the current social order (often to restore it to the realm's previous idyllic state) or overcoming some threat that no one else is aware of or able to face.

Character development 

Characters may start as solitary wanderers in romantic fantasy, but they never remain that way for long. One of the key features of romantic fantasy involves the focus on social, and to a lesser extent, political relationships. The characters all find close friends, lovers, and other companions with whom they either live or travel, as well as a larger social circle where they all belong. In addition, many character have significant ties with the larger world. Many of these characters have noble titles, or a sworn duty to their kingdom. The rootless travelers of sword and sorcery novels are rarely found in romantic fantasy.

Examples of romantic fantasy in literature 
 Catherine Asaro's Lost Continent (aka Aronsdale) series; The Night Bird.
 Mercedes Lackey's Tales of the Five Hundred Kingdoms series; Fairy Godmother, One Good Knight, Fortune's Fool, "The Snow Queen", "The Sleeping Beauty".
 Tamora Pierce's The Immortals quartet; Wild Magic, Wolf-Speaker, Emperor Mage, The Realms of the Gods.
 Wen Spencer's Tinker (Elfhome) series.

See also 
 Romance novel
 Medieval fantasy

References 

 
Fantasy genres
Romance
Film genres
Fiction by genre
Literary genres
Romance genres